Sene may refer to:

Places
 Séné, Morbihan, Brittany, France; a commune
 Canton of Séné, Morbihan, Brittany, France
 Sene District, Brong Ahafo Region, Ghana
 Sene River, Ghana; a river in the Sene District

People
 Sène, a patronym of the Serer people in West Africa
Surnamed
 Adama François Sene (born 1989) Senegalese soccer player
 Alioune Sene (born 1996) Senegalese-French pole vaulter
 Amy Sène (born 1986) French-Senegalese track and field athlete
 Badara Sène (footballer) (born 1984) Senegalese soccer player
 Benjamin Sene (born 1994) French basketball player
 Jean-Baptiste-Claude Sené (1747-1803) French furniture maker
 Jesse Sene-Lefao (born 1989) Samoan rugby footballer
 Josep Señé (born 1991) Spanish soccer player
 Karim Sène (born 1971) Senegalese pole vaulter
 Mamadou Sène (born 1960) Senegalese sprinter
 Matar Sène (born 1970) Senegalese wrestler
 Monique Sené, nuclear physicist
 Moussa Sene Absa (born 1958) Senegalese filmmaker
 Moussa Sène (born 1946) Senegalese basketball player
 Mouhamed Sene (born 1986) Senegalese basketball player
 Ndéye Séne (born 1988) Senegalese basketball player
 Oumar Sène (born 1959) Senegalese soccer player
 Pierre Sène (born 1964) Senegalese judoka
 Saer Sene (disambiguation)
 Saër Sène (born 1986) French soccer player
 Stephen Sene (born 1983) U.S. American football player
 Yacine Sene (born 1982) French basketball player
 Yandé Codou Sène (born 1932) Senegalese singer
Givennamed
 Sene Naoupu (born 1984) Irish rugby player

Linguistics
 Sene language, a Papuan language
 SENE, Southeastern New England English, see New England English

Other uses
 SENE, a U.S. luxury brand
 The Samoan sene, a monetary subunit of the tālā

See also

 
 Sene East (district), Ghana
 Sene East (Ghana parliament constituency)
 Sene West (Ghana parliament constituency)
 Sene West (district), Ghana
 Senés, Almeria, Andalusia, Spain
 Senés de Alcubierre, Huesca, Aragon, Spain